Guy Schwartz (born February 17, 1952) is an American musician, bandleader, songwriter, videographer, music journalist, media activist, and 2016 presidential candidate, mostly known for his collaborative involvement with other Texas musicians, a couple of regional minor-hit records in the 1970s and 1980s, his three local Houston, Texas cable access TV series featuring local and regional original music, and live performances featuring set pieces plus spontaneous music and lyrics.

Career

Music
Schwartz began taking piano lessons and doing voice work on radio commercials at age five. The crew assembled to record spots for his father's furniture store in Newark, New Jersey, included the voice of Pat Conell, a local DJ on a 'race-music' station (who later became the first black network announcer), and two teenagers who wrote (Don Kirshner) and sang (Bobby Darin) the jingles. Schwartz credits the witnessing of Darin's rise on the music charts as his primary inspiration for a lifetime in music.

At ten, after his family moved to Houston, Texas in 1962, he switched to drums, then bass at 15. He attended Houston's Memorial High School and was classmates with Vince Bell, and Bill Browder. In 1966, as a fourteen-year-old, Schwartz met vocalist Ray Salazar and began gigging at Old Market Square in downtown Houston, at all-night clubs and dancehalls in Texas and southern Louisiana, and on the east Texas soul circuit.

Schwartz did some of his early basswork behind Sam "Lightnin'" Hopkins, John Lee Hooker, BW Stephenson and Blaze Foley.

While an opening act for Pete Samson & Roadmap in 1973, Schwartz met recording studio manager Roger Tausz and began his recording career and a lifelong association with Tausz. Using Roadmap as a studio band, Schwartz recorded four songs, including 'Ride That Train', which broke onto local, the regional radio, and 'I Found God At A Truckstop', which was recorded by many, including Pete Samson & Kinky Friedman, but only released by Samson & Schwartz. These small successes gave Schwartz the credibility and momentum on which he built his regional music career.

In 1976, Schwartz co-founded the band RELAYER, who only released one (RELAYER – 1977) of the three albums they recorded, but, found an underground prog-rock audience in the US and parts of Europe (partially thanks to the guitar work of Michael Knust from the Texas band Fever Tree, and the similarity of the band's name with that of an album by British prog-rockers, Yes).

In 1978, Schwartz released his first solo album, featuring collaborations with two dozen Texas musicians with whom he performed live (on guitar for the first time) in a loosely knit group called Guy Schwartz & The Zap Rhythm Band, including Knust, Tausz, Tony Braunagel and Billy Block, each of whom found careers in music.

In 1980, Schwartz teamed with Randy Soffar and formed Z-ROCKS, a new-wave power-pop band that had 3 minor regional hits fueled by touring with the likes of Duran Duran, Todd Rundgren and Huey Lewis and The News. After their first album was added to over 200 radio stations across the US, it was reviewed as 'too derivative'. Z-ROCKS never released its second album and disbanded in 1986.

From 1987 to 1997, Schwartz recorded and toured as a sideman, and went back to school (University of Houston) to study video production and digital media to keep up with the new digital music business.

In 1997, Tausz & Schwartz reunited to update and remix that first solo album, and went on to record another two dozen albums together, forming a band, THE NEW JACK HIPPIES, which toured the US and western Europe from 1999 until 2004, and still performs regionally in Texas. Schwartz tours as a solo, and performs on tour with other bands in their locales. Schwartz' repertoire includes rock songs, blues, funk and americana, with a bit of humor and songs about weed thrown in for good measure.

Since 2001, Schwartz has settled into a 2-year cycle which includes and annual free local original music festival and TV shoot (SOUTH BY DUE EAST – now in its 14th year), production of the TV series, new films and an album of new songs every year or two, and 3–6 months of touring. He's also looked to the past and engineered reunion shows and recordings with The Zap Rhythm Band (new songs – released August 2014) and Z-ROCKS (new recordings of old songs – unreleased). In 2012, Schwartz formed a band full of Austin players (Guy Schwartz & The Affordables) to perform locally in Austin, Texas. A live album and DVD of that experience will be forthcoming in 2014 or 2015.

Video and film
Guy Schwartz & Marlo Blue  formed their SIRIUS HIPPIES PRODUCTIONS and have produced (and Schwartz has directed) several films and television series based upon the careers and live performances of Texas musicians and the Texas music scene, as seen through Schwartz' events, concerts and 'ad hoc' unconventional touring. His film/video career was a natural extension of his local music journalism, and desire to promote the Houston, Texas original music scene, and his music, in the digital age.

Directing concert films on Billy Joe Shaver, Mr. Scarface and Carolyn Wonderland, as well as films about SOUTH BY DUE EAST and Schwartz' own New Jack Hippies, Schwartz & Blue have created three successful TV series – 'Hippies.TV' (14th season), 'SOUTH BY DUE EAST TELEVISION'(8th season), and 'Guy Schwartz' Road Journal'(4th season).

Schwartz has also created music videos for Texas artists, including Trudy Lynn (2), Steve Krase (2), Tom The Folksinger, Hogan & Moss, and Almost Endless Summer, as well as several videos for his own music releases.

Community events and activism
Guy Schwartz has served five elected terms on The Harris County Democratic Party Executive Committee, was a founding volunteer at Houston's Pacifica Radio station KPFT, founding  a 'local music' program on the station in 1975, and has been active in movements to legalize marijuana and protect consumers and the middle class. He and Marlo Blue shoot & record bands and musicians at SOUTH BY DUE EAST (a Guerilla Marketing Experiment, Movie Shoot, & Indie Music Festival in Houston, Texas, USA.) every March since 2003, making TV shows, indie films, radio shows, podcasts and compilation CDs, and put them out there to promote the artists, and the Houston, Texas, USA original music community. They say that they "give the artists free video and mixed audio and hope it helps." Schwartz declared his non-partisan candidacy for the U.S. presidency in August, 2015, which was unsuccessful and ended in Iowa.In 2016, Schwartz, Blue & Tausz formed The Guy Schwartz Foundation for Houston's Original Music, a Texas non-profit aimed at archiving, supporting and promoting the original music, musicians, and music scene of Houston, Texas, USA.

Discography

Filmography

Films
 GOTTA KEEP THE MUSIC ALIVE – New Jack Hippies on Tour, 2002
 BLOODLESS REVOLUTION:Carolyn Wonderland In Amsterdam, 2004
 THE FORMALDEHYDE FUNK MEN LIVE January 23, 2005 starring Mr. Scarface, 2005
 Billy Joe Shaver: North Carolina 2006, 2007
 BLUESGUY'S ROCK-N-ROLL HOUSE PARTY, 2007
 PERFORMANCES, 2007
 SOUTH BY DUE EAST 2007, 2008
 Guy Schwartz' Guide To Jams & Open Mics. 2008
 RHYTHM & RHYME – A Tribute To Shannon Taylor, 2009
 Teresa James & the Rhythm Tramps – Live At The Howling Coyote, 2009
 THE AFFORDABLE TOUR, 2010
 LIVE IN AUSTIN:Guy Schwartz & The Affordables 2013

Television
 Hippies.TV – 15th Season
 SOUTH BY DUE EAST Television – 10th Season
 Guy Schwartz' Road Journal – 4th Season
 MUSICeveryMARCH – 2 Seasons

References

1952 births
Living people
American bandleaders
Musicians from Texas
American music journalists
Candidates in the 2016 United States presidential election
21st-century American politicians